Louis Emile Auguste Tellier (2 November 1886 – 3 November 1921) was a French professional golfer. He had five top-10 finishes in major championships.

Golf career
Tellier came to the United States to play in the 1913 U.S. Open at The Country Club in Brookline, Massachusetts. He finished tied for fourth.

After a short return visit to France, Tellier returned to the U.S. in 1914 to become head professional at Canoe Brook Country Club in Summit, New Jersey. He moved to The Country Club, site of the 1913 U.S. Open, in 1916 and to Brae Burn Country Club in West Newton, Massachusetts in 1919.

1921 Massachusetts Open
Tellier's only significant win came at the 1921 Massachusetts Open a month before his death. He led the 1913 U.S. Open with seven holes to go, but faltered and finished in a tie for 4th. In 1915 he co-led the U.S. Open after two rounds, and finished 4th.

Death
On 3 November 1921, Tellier committed suicide at Brae Burn Country Club in West Newton, Massachusetts. He was found hanging by a small rope in a shed on the golf course. The motive of the suicide was not known but family members told authorities that he had not been feeling well for quite some time. Fellow professional golfers Arthur Reid and Wilfrid Reid were Tellier's brothers-in-law.

Tournament wins
1921 Massachusetts Open

Results in major championships

Note: the Masters Tournament was not founded until 1934.

NYF = tournament not yet founded
NT = no tournament
CUT = missed the half-way cut
R32, R16, QF, SF = round in which player lost in PGA Championship match play
"T" indicates a tie for a place

Team appearances
France–United States Professional Match (representing France): 1913 (winners)

References

French male golfers
PGA Tour golfers
Suicides by hanging in Massachusetts
Sportspeople from Summit, New Jersey
Sportspeople from Newton, Massachusetts
1886 births
1921 suicides